The men's 100 metre freestyle event at the 1988 Summer Olympics took place on 22 September at the Jamsil Indoor Swimming Pool in Seoul, South Korea. There were 77 competitors from 51 nations. Nations had been limited to two swimmers each since the 1984 Games.

American Matt Biondi set a new Olympic record to claim his first ever individual gold and fourth medal in swimming at these Games (fifth in his career, with a relay gold in 1984). Maintaining a lead from start to finish, he pulled away from a star-studded field to hit the wall first in 48.63. Biondi also enjoyed his teammate Chris Jacobs taking home the silver in 49.08, as the Americans climbed on the top two steps of the podium for the sixth time in the event's Olympic history. Earlier in the prelims, Jacobs sliced off Rowdy Gaines' 1984 record by six-tenths of a second to establish a new Olympic standard of 49.20 in the eighth heat, until Biondi eventually lowered it to 49.04 in the final of ten heats. Meanwhile, France's Stéphan Caron held off an intense sprint battle against Soviet duo Gennadiy Prigoda and Iurie Başcatov to take home the bronze in 49.62.

Background

This was the 20th appearance of the men's 100 metre freestyle. The event has been held at every Summer Olympics except 1900 (when the shortest freestyle was the 200 metres), though the 1904 version was measured in yards rather than metres.

Three of the eight finalists from the 1984 Games returned: two-time bronze medalist Per Johansson of Sweden, fifth-place finisher Dano Halsall of Switzerland, and sixth-place finisher Stéphan Caron of France. Caron was also the runner-up in the 1986 world championships behind Matt Biondi of the United States.

Biondi had come to Seoul with the goal of matching Mark Spitz's seven gold medals in a single Games. That goal had already been frustrated by the time of the 100 metre freestyle (his best race), as his first three events had resulted in only one golds along with a silver and a bronze. Biondi still had an excellent chance of achieving as many gold medals (5) as anyone not named Spitz had before 1988, however, with the 100 free, 50 free, and two relays to go, though Kristin Otto was on her way towards 6 golds in Seoul as well.

Guam, Senegal, the United Arab Emirates, and Uruguay each made their debut in the event. The United States made its 19th appearance, most of any nation, having missed only the boycotted 1980 Games.

Competition format

This freestyle swimming competition used the A/B final format instituted in 1984. The competition consisted of two rounds: heats and finals. The swimmers with the best 8 times in the semifinals advanced to the A final, competing for medals through 8th place. The swimmers with the next 8 times in the semifinals competed in the B final for 9th through 16th place. Swim-offs were used as necessary to determine advancement.

Records

Prior to this competition, the existing world and Olympic records were as follows.

The following records were established during the competition:

Schedule

All times are Korea Standard Time adjusted for daylight savings (UTC+10)

Results

Heats

Rule: The eight fastest swimmers advance to final A, while the next eight to final B.

Finals

Final B

Final A

References

External links
 Official Report
 USA Swimming

Swimming at the 1988 Summer Olympics
Men's events at the 1988 Summer Olympics